Marmion Lake is a lake in Rainy River District, Ontario, Canada.

See also
List of lakes in Ontario

References
 National Resources Canada

Lakes of Rainy River District